Luka Ščuka (born 23 May 2002) is a Slovenian professional basketball player for Mornar of the ABA League and the Montenegrin League. He is a 2.08m tall forward.

Professional career
Ščuka started playing basketball for Nova Gorica mladi.

On 24 September 2020 Ščuka signed a four-year contract with the Cedevita Olimpija. 

On 23 June 2022 Ščuka was loaned to Mornar of the ABA League and the Montenegrin League.

References

External links
 Eurobasket.com profile
 REALGM profile
 PROBALLERS profile

2002 births
Living people
ABA League players
KK Cedevita Olimpija players
Slovenian men's basketball players
Small forwards
People from Šempeter pri Gorici
Power forwards (basketball)